Ducrosa (minor planet designation: 400 Ducrosa) is a typical Main belt asteroid. It was discovered by Auguste Charlois on 15 March 1895 in Nice.

Photometric measurements of the asteroid made in 2005 at the Palmer Divide Observatory showed a light curve with a period of 6.87 ± 0.01 hours and a brightness variation of 0.62 ± 0.02 in magnitude.

References

External links 
 Lightcurve plot of 400 Ducrosa, Palmer Divide Observatory, B. D. Warner (2005)
 Asteroid Lightcurve Database (LCDB), query form (info )
 Dictionary of Minor Planet Names, Google books
 Asteroids and comets rotation curves, CdR – Observatoire de Genève, Raoul Behrend
 Discovery Circumstances: Numbered Minor Planets (1)-(5000) – Minor Planet Center
 
 

000400
Discoveries by Auguste Charlois
Named minor planets
18950315